The Nimbus 42 is a Swedish sailboat that was designed by Americans F. Michael Kaufman and Robert Ladd as a cruiser-racer and first built in 1981.

Production
The design was built by Albin Marine in Sweden. It was produced from 1981 to 1985, but it is now out of production.

Design
The Nimbus 42 is a recreational keelboat, built predominantly of fiberglass, with an Airex-cored deck and wood trim, including teak decks. It has a cutter rig, with aluminum spars and a keel-stepped mast. It features a raked stem, a raised counter reverse transom, a skeg-mounted rudder controlled by a wheel and a fixed fin keel, deep keel or optional stub keel and centerboard. It displaces  and carries  of ballast.

The design has sleeping accommodation for eight people, with a double "V"-berth in the bow cabin, an "U"-shaped settee and drop-down dinette table that forms a double berth, plus a straight settee in the main cabin. There is an aft stateroom with a double berth on the port side and a single berth on the starboard side. The galley is located on the port side just forward of the companionway steps. The galley is "U"-shaped and is equipped with a three-burner propane-fired stove and oven, plus a double sink and an icebox. A navigation station is opposite the galley, on the starboard side. There are two heads, one just aft of the bow cabin on the port side and one on the starboard side in the aft cabin.

Ventilation is provided by six translucent opening hatches, two dorade vents and four deck cowl intakes. Additional light is provided by four deck-mounted prisms.

For sailing the design is equipped with four halyard winches and two jib winches. The halyards are all internally-mounted. There are topping lifts for the boom and spinnaker. Both the genoa and spinnaker pole are mounted on tracks with cars. There is a bow-mounted anchor locker.

Variants
Nimbus 42 Standard
Nimbus 42 Race
Nimbus 42 Keel & Centerboard

Operational history
In a 1994 review Richard Sherwood wrote, "Nimbus is a big auxiliary with three cabins, but with a tall, high-aspect rig for racing, Shrouds are inboard for good wind ward sheeting angles. The keel is relatively short and the rudder is well aft."

See also
List of sailing boat types

Similar sailboats
Dickerson 41
Irwin 41
Irwin 41 Citation
Lord Nelson 41
Morgan Out Island 41
Newport 41

References

Keelboats
1980s sailboat type designs
Sailing yachts
Sailboat type designs by F. Michael Kaufman
Sailboat type designs by Robert Ladd
Sailboat type designs by Kaufman & Ladd
Sailboat types built by Albin Marine